Wajee Kertsombun (born 2 April 1988) is a Thai footballer who plays as a midfielder. She has been a member of the Thailand women's national team.

International career
Wajee represented Thailand at the 2005 AFC U-17 Women's Championship and the 2007 AFC U-19 Women's Championship. She capped at senior level during three AFC Women's Asian Cup editions (2006, 2008 and 2010), two Asian Games editions (2006 and 2010), the 2007 Southeast Asian Games, and the 2012 AFC Women's Olympic Qualifying Tournament.

References

1988 births
Living people
Wajee Kertsombun
Women's association football midfielders
Wajee Kertsombun
Footballers at the 2006 Asian Games
Competitors at the 2007 Southeast Asian Games
Wajee Kertsombun
Southeast Asian Games medalists in football
Footballers at the 2010 Asian Games